The Bahamas National Baptist Missionary and Educational Convention is a Baptist Christian denomination in Bahamas. It is affiliated with the Baptist World Alliance. The headquarters is in Nassau.

History
The Bahamas National Baptist Missionary and Educational Convention has its origins in a mission of the National Baptist Convention, USA, Inc. in 1925.  It was officially founded in 1935.  According to a denomination census released in 2020, it claimed 400 churches and 78,000 members.

See also
 Bible
 Born again
 Baptist beliefs
 Worship service (evangelicalism)
 Jesus Christ
 Believers' Church

References

Baptist denominations in the Caribbean
Evangelicalism in the Bahamas